Murad Gaidarov (born February 13, 1980, in Khasavyurt, Dagestan),  also known as  Murad Haidarau, is an Avar Russian - Belarusian wrestler. Gaidarov was disqualified from 2004 Summer Olympics for retaliating after he was defeated at the quarterfinals and assaulted his opponent, Buvaisar Saitiev, off the arena floor. Gaidarov won the bronze medal in men's 74 kg freestyle wrestling at the 2008 Summer Olympics, but after a failed drug test by Soslan Tigiev, he won a silver medal.
He has an older brother Gaidar Gaidarov who is second coach of Dagestan wrestling team and the Italian national team.

He began coaching Indian wrestler Deepak Punia in 2018.  He was dismissed from his position by the Wrestling Federation of India in 2021 after assaulting a referee at the 2020 Summer Olympics in Tokyo.  He was expelled from the Games by the IOC.

References

External links
 

Belarusian male sport wrestlers
Olympic wrestlers of Belarus
Wrestlers at the 2004 Summer Olympics
Wrestlers at the 2008 Summer Olympics
1980 births
Living people
Avar people
People from Khasavyurt
Olympic medalists in wrestling
Medalists at the 2008 Summer Olympics
Belarusian people of Dagestani descent
World Wrestling Championships medalists
Olympic silver medalists for Belarus
European Wrestling Championships medalists
21st-century Belarusian people
20th-century Belarusian people